Orbexilum simplex is a species of flowering plant in the legume family known by the common name singlestem leather-root. It is found in the south-central United States.

References

simplex